The following is a complete list of winners of Breeders Crown races, as recorded by The Hambletonian Society.

2014
All races held at The Meadowlands

2013
All races held at Mohegan Sun at Pocono Downs

2012
All races held at Woodbine Racetrack

2011
All races held at Woodbine Racetrack

2010
All races held at Mohegan Sun at Pocono Downs

2009

2008

2007

2006

2005

2004

2003

2002

2001

2000

1999

1998

1997

1996

1995

1994

1993

1992

1991

1990
All races held at Pompano Harness

1989

1988

1987

1986

1985

1984

Lists of horse racing results
Breeders Crown